Paxsi Awki (Aymara paxsi moon, awki father / mister, sir, lord, "moon father" or moon lord", Hispanicized spellings Pacsiauqui, Pacchiauqui) is a mountain in the Andes of southern Peru, about  high. It is situated in the Moquegua Region, Mariscal Nieto Province, Carumas District, and in the Tacna Region, Candarave Province, Candarave District.

References

Mountains of Peru
Mountains of Moquegua Region
Mountains of Tacna Region